Księżomierz-Kolonia  is a village in the administrative district of Gmina Gościeradów, within Kraśnik County, Lublin Voivodeship, in eastern Poland.

The village has a population of 1,400.

References

Villages in Kraśnik County